Isocodeine is an opioid research chemical related to codeine.  It is an epimer of codeine that can be prepared from codeine via a Mitsunobu reaction.

Dozens of derivatives and analogs of isocodeine and the related compound isomorphine have been produced. One of these, dihydroisocodeine is a pharmaceutical four times stronger than dihydrocodeine and thus six times stronger than codeine which was used more extensively in the past in Continental Europe and other locales.  Other isomers of codeine include allocodeine, pseudocodeine, heterocodeine and substances with intermediate qualities such as pseudoallocodeine and formylallocodeine can be prepared in the laboratory.

References

Opioids